William Roe Howell (April 9, 1846 - December 30, 1890) was a prominent New York City photographer of the 1870s, known mostly for portraits of political and theatrical celebrities.

Was awarded a special grand prize at the World's Fair held in Vienna, Austria (Weltausstellung 1873 Wien). A collection of these photos, under the title of Howell's Album of Studies, sold in the U.S. for $8.00.

Howell closed his New York studio around 1880 and went into retirement. In 1886, he was living in Washington, D.C. attempting to open a new studio. In 1887, two weeks before its formal opening, he disappeared, and left his wife and five children penniless.  His wife admitted he was an eccentric man and was bothered by his business partner for spending too much money.  Howell eventually returned to his family, but the studio was not a success.

Howell moved back to New York around 1889 and died in 1890 of tuberculosis at the home of fellow photographer, Lawrence Perkinson. He was buried at Slate Hill Cemetery, Goshen, New York.

Howell died when he was 44 and never gained the name recognition that other contemporary photographers have attained such as Mathew Brady or Napoleon Sarony. Many of his celebrity photographs are regularly sold on eBay.

External links

1846 births
1890 deaths
American portrait photographers
Photographers from New York City